Play Me Backwards is an album by the American musician Joan Baez, released in 1992. The album was nominated for a Grammy for Best Contemporary Folk Recording. Baez supported it with an international tour.

In 2012, to commemorate the twentieth anniversary of the album's original release, Play Me Backwards was reissued, digitally remastered, and including new liner notes; three bonus tracks—recorded during the original sessions, but not included on the original release—were included: "The Trouble With the Truth", "Medicine Wheel" and a cover of Bob Dylan's "Seven Curses".

Production
Recorded in Nashville, the album was produced by Wally Wilson and Kenny Greenberg. Baez sought out material after being dismayed with the songs pitched to her; she spent 14 months trying to find the right songs. The album's first single, "Stones in the Road", for which Baez shot a video, is a cover of the Mary Chapin Carpenter song. "Through Your Hands" was written by John Hiatt. "I'm with You" is about Baez's son, Gabriel.

Critical reception

The Boston Globe called Play Me Backwards "mostly an album of mature, surprisingly percussive folk-pop love songs that marks her finest work since her Diamonds and Rust album of 1975." The Sun-Sentinel wrote that "Baez's erstwhile hyper-quivering soprano thankfully does not flutter so much, and has deepened marvelously with age."

The Chicago Tribune deemed the album "a surprisingly relaxed, rhythmic and modern set that sounds like it could have been recorded by any one of a number of today's folk-and country-flavored pop female singer-songwriters." The Indianapolis Star noted that "Baez's voice sounds as pure as ever."

Track listing
All tracks composed by Joan Baez, Wally Wilson and Kenny Greenberg, except where indicated.

"Play Me Backwards"
"Amsterdam" (Janis Ian, Buddy Mondlock)
"Isaac and Abraham"
"Stones in the Road" (Mary Chapin Carpenter)
"Steal Across the Border" (Ron Davies)
"I'm with You" (Baez)
"I'm with You" (Reprise) (Baez)
"Strange Rivers" (John Stewart)
"Through Your Hands" (John Hiatt)
"The Dream Song"
"The Edge of Glory"

Personnel
Joan Baez - guitar, vocals
James A. Ball - engineer
Greg Barnhill - backing vocals
Richard Bennett - electric guitar
Ashley Cleveland - backing vocals
Peter Coleman - engineer
Chad Cromwell - drums
Tom Dolan - design
Jerry Douglas - Dobro, guitar, lap steel guitar, Weissenborn
Roy Gamble - engineer, second engineer
Aaron D. Jacoves - A&R/executive producer
Carl Gorodetzky - violin
Eric Gorodetzky - engineer, second engineer
Kenny Greenberg - acoustic and electric guitar, producer
Mick Haggerty - art direction
Vicki Hampton - backing vocals
Mike Lawler - organ, synthesizer
Bob Ludwig - mastering
Bob Mason - cello
Edgar Meyer - upright bass
Jonell Mosser - backing vocals
Steve Nathan - organ, Wurlitzer
Melanie Nissen - photography
Greg Parker - engineer, second engineer
Cyndi Richardson - backing vocals
Jerry Roady - percussion
Tom Roady - percussion
Chris Rodriguez - backing vocals
Ed Simonton - engineer, second engineer
Pamela Sixfin - violin
Kevin Smith - mixing
James Stroud - drums
Marcos Suzano - percussion, berimbau
Willie Weeks - bass guitar
Kristin Wilkinson - viola
Wally Wilson - synthesizer, piano, producer
Glenn Worf - bass guitar
Taylor York - engineer

References

Joan Baez albums
1992 albums
Virgin Records albums
Albums produced by Wally Wilson
Albums produced by Kenny Greenberg